Helictochloa is a genus of Eurasian, North African, and North American plants in the grass family.

 Species

See also 
 List of Poaceae genera

References 

Poaceae genera
Pooideae